Plicatiductus is a monotypic genus of Southeast Asian sheet weavers containing the single species, Plicatiductus storki. It was first described by Alfred Frank Millidge & A. Russell-Smith in 1992, and has only been found in Indonesia and on the Sulawesi.

See also
 List of Linyphiidae species (I–P)

References

Linyphiidae
Monotypic Araneomorphae genera
Spiders of Asia